Simon Beta (born Simone Della Zoppa; 6 July 1982) is an Italian record producer, progressive house DJ, and remixer, active since 1997 with many names (Simon Beta, Furious F*ckerz, Doctors In Florence, Rehnoir, Jack Empire, Sexycools and many more).

Some of his most popular recent songs include two collaborations with the Dutch star Marco V "Lotus" and "Limitess" (this last featured by Gabrielle Ross), both released by Flamingo Recordings Fedde Le Grand's label, and "Where My Heart Lives" released on the British label Cr2 with the featuring of Amanda Wilson respectively number 13 and 27 Beatport General Chart and number 9 Beatport progressive house chart in 2012-2013-2014 Years.

He also is remixer of artists like Corona (singer) the famous Italian singer of the nineties for the hit "Baby Baby" or for William Naraine the frontman of the famous Double You of for Ron Carroll (Bob Sinclar's singer), David Jones (Beatport second bestseller ever) or for Thomas Newson (Author of Pallaroid Revealed Recordings / Flute Spinnin Records)

From 2010 to 2014 Simon Beta founded a team called Doctors In Florence with Luca Palmieri and Fabio Andromda and decided to stop each other projects and released to dedicate totally himself to this new project.

After the dissolution of the team Doctors In Florence in the 2014, Simon has started to use again his first name "Simon Beta" and now works as a duo with his partner Luca Palmieri (since 2014 Mike Lucas) his already partner in Doctors In Florence's Team.

In 2017 Simon Beta and Mike Lucas created a new project called Sexycools, born for mainstream music, producing some new versions of some hits of the '90 such as "The Rhythm Of The Night" and "Baby Baby" with Corona (released with Simon From Deep Divas the son of Corona) "Sunshine And Happiness" (Nerio's Dubwork Feat. Darryl Pandy), "Uh La La La" (Alexia) and more

In 2019 has been released an important single by Sony Music with the featuring of Ne-Yo called "U R The One".
In 2020 a new single with Snoop Dogg called "Lolita" and "Coming Home" sees the light on Sony Music.

Simon Beta's track has been played by various other artists like Tiesto, David Guetta, Bob Sinclar and many many more.

Now in the fourth format of his radio show (Hardstorm, Going To Party, Doctors In Progress and now Bangerang Radio Show) he broadcast it in 10 countries in the world.

Singles 

 2019-01-31 Sexycools & Stefy De Cicco "Coming Home" [Sony Music]
 2020-01-06 Mike Lucas & Simon Beta Feat Snoop Dogg "Lolita" [Sony Music]
 2019-02-22 Sexycools & Audiosonic Feat. Ne-Yo "U R The One"  [Sony Music]
 2019-01-11 Deep Divas & Sexycools "Baby Baby"  [Dance & Love Records]
 2019-01-11 Deep Divas & Sexycools "The Rhythm Of The Night" [Dance & Love Records]
 2018-06-08 Deep Divas & Sexycools Feat. Alexia "Uh La La La" [Zyx Records] 
 2018-04-27 Sexycools & Audiosonic "Sunshine And Happiness" [Blanco Y Negro]
 2015-10-16 Arda Diri, Mike Lucas & Simon Beta "Soul Night" [Playbox Music]
 2015-06-01 Simon Beta, Christopher Ank, Gerard Kidman, Mike Lucas  "Thor" [Bonerizing Records]
 2015-03-03 Simon Beta & Mike Lucas "Khomm" [Virus T Studio Records]
 2014-02-17 Mike Lucas & Simon Beta Feat. Amanda Wilson "Where My Heart Lives" [Cr2 Records]
 2014-02-03 Simon Beta & Mike Lucas "Ready" [Virus T Studio Records]
 2013-08-15 Billy Sizemore & Rehnoir "Wobble 2X" [Consistent Recordings]
 2013-04-26 Deep Divas & Rehnoir "Phaze" [BitPull Recordings]
 2013-04-15 Marco V & Doctors In Florence Feat. Jade Ross "Lotus(Limitless)" [Flamingo Recordings]
 2012-10-29 Marco V & Doctors In Florence "Lotus" [Flamingo Recordings]
 2012-12-20 Doctors In Florence "Blackbeat" [Consistent Records]
 2011-01-12 Doctors In Florence "Heart Vibrations" [Adaptor Recordings]
 2011-04-21 Doctors In Florence "Back 2 Life" [Adaptor Recordings]
 2011-03-24 Doctors In Florence "Kindred Spirit" [Adaptor Recordings]
 2010 Dj Garath & Simon Beta "Evil"
 2010 Dj Rehnoir & Fabio Andromeda Meets Luca Palmieri "God Save The Rhythm"
 2010-03-06 Dj Rehnoir & Fabio Andromeda "Toboga"
 2010 Jimmy The Sound Vs Simon Beta "Vanity Of Insanity"
 2009 Dj Garath & Simon Beta "Phobia"
 2009-06-29 - Fabio Andromeda & Simon Beta "Microwave" [Electroburn Records]
 2009 Gladiator & The Furious Fuckerz "Black Straight" [Ipnotika Records]
 2009 Maurizio Ferrari & The Furious Fuckerz "Snap" [Ipnotika Records]
 2008 Gladiator & The Furious Fuckerz Meets Air Teo "Teoschock08" [Burned Records]
 2008 Simon Beta "Hellboy"
 2007 Simon Beta "The Greatest" 
 2006 Simon Beta "Check Point" 
 2005 Simon Beta "The Man On The Moon" 
 2003 Simon Beta "Pusher"
 2003 Simon Beta "Time Will Never Stop"
 2003 Simon Beta "Hard-est Style"
 2003 Simon Beta "Noize System 3"

Remixes 

 2016-07-29 Twoloud "My Remedy (Milke Lucas & Simon Beta Remix)
 2015-08-07 Danny Avila & KAAZE "Close Your Eyes (Simon Beta, Arda Diri, Mike Lucas Remix)" (Playbox Records)
 2015 Sterling Fox "Holy" (Mike Lucas & Simon Beta Remix)" ( Bonerizing Records )
 2014 David Jones & Ron Carroll "You & Me (Mike Lucas & Simon Beta Remix)" ( Time Records )
 2014 Luengo & Diaz "Erase & Rewind (Christopher Ank & Rehnoir Remix)" (High 5 Records)
 2013 Deep Divas & Rehnoir "Phaze" [BitPull Records]
 2013 Corona (singer) & Simon From Deep Divas "Baby Baby 2k13 (Party Killers & Rehnoir Remix)" DWA Records
 2013 Thomas Newson "Neutron (Doctors In Florence Remix)" (In Charge Records)
 2009 Jack & Joy Ft Belle Erskine "Break This Down"(Doctors In Florence Remix)(Adaptor Recordings)
 2012 40's Mood "India" (Doctors In Florence Remix) Time Records
 2012 Maxime Zanetti "Amnesia" (Doctors In Florence Remix)
 2011 Yiruma "River Flows In You" (Doctors In Florence Remix)
 2011 William Naraine "If I Could Fall" (Doctors In Florence RMX) Ultra Records
 2011 Phandora "Ruby Rain" (Doctors In Florence RMX)
 2010 Jack & Joy Feat. Belle Erskine "Break This Down" (Doctors In Florence RMX)
 2010 "Adagio For Strings" (Doctors In Florence RMX)
 2010 Daresh Shyzmoon "Dharma" (Fabio Andromeda & Dj Rehnoir Rmx)
 2010 Music Hazard Inc. "Axel" (Fabio Andromeda & Dj Rehnoir Rmx)

See also 
 Electronic dance music
 Progressive house
 House
 dj
 Hardstyle

References 
 Doctors In Forence interview at Radio Deejay and Deejay Television

External links 
 Sito personale
 Pagina Facebook
 Twitter personale

1982 births
Living people
Italian record producers